Dubodiel  is a village and municipality in Trenčín District in the Trenčín Region of north-western Slovakia.

Names and etymology
The name comes from Slovak dub (oak) and diel (a part). Dubodiel - probably an oak forest dividing the landscape into more parts. Dubowy del 1439, Dwbodyel 1493, Dubodiel 1598, Dubodiel 1773.

History
In historical records the village was first mentioned in 1439.

Geography
The municipality lies at an altitude of 310 metres and covers an area of 20.191 km². It has a population of about 960 people.

Genealogical resources

The records for genealogical research are available at the state archive "Statny Archiv in Banska Bystrica, Nitra, Slovakia"

 Roman Catholic church records (births/marriages/deaths): 1782-1896 (parish A)
 Lutheran church records (births/marriages/deaths): 1729-1895 (parish B)

See also
 List of municipalities and towns in Slovakia

References

External links
 
 
https://web.archive.org/web/20071027094149/http://www.statistics.sk/mosmis/eng/run.html
Surnames of living people in Dubodiel

Villages and municipalities in Trenčín District